WGLZ is a Top 40 formatted broadcast radio station licensed to West Liberty, West Virginia, serving West Liberty in West Virginia and Tiltonsville in Ohio.  WGLZ is owned and operated by West Liberty University.

External links
 91.5 WGLZ Online
 
 
 

GLZ
GLZ